Phyllis Deakin (1899–1997) was born in Sheffield. She was the first woman journalist with The Times. During the second World War she was one of the first six British accredited women war correspondents, along with Phyllis Davies and  C. W. Shepherd. 

In 1943 she initiated the Women's Press Club and was its first Chair.

References 

20th-century British journalists
War correspondents of World War II
1899 births
1997 deaths